Guerrero is a surname of Spanish origin meaning warrior.

This is a list of notable persons with the surname Guerrero.
Following Spanish naming customs, only individuals whose first or paternal family name is Guerrero are included.

A
Adabel Guerrero (born 1978), Argentine dancer, actress, singer and vedette
Alex Guerrero (lineman) (born 1984), American football player
Alex Guerrero (born 1965), American alternative medicine practitioner
Alex Guerrero (born 1986), Cuban baseball player
Alberto Guerrero (1886–1959), Chilean-Canadian composer, pianist, and teacher
Alberto Guerrero Martínez (1878–1941), Ecuadorian politician
Álvaro Guerrero (born 1979), Mexican actor
Ángel Sergio Guerrero Mier (1935–2021), Mexican politician and lawyer
Angelica Guerrero-Cuellar, American politician
Anuar Guerrero (born 1979), Colombian soccer player

B
Belem Guerrero (born 1974), Mexican track cyclist

C
Carlos Guerrero (disambiguation)
Carmen Guerrero Nakpil (1922–2018), Filipino writer and historian
Chavo Guerrero Jr. (born 1970), Mexican-American professional wrestler
Chavo Guerrero Sr. (1949–2017), Mexican-American professional wrestler
Clara Guerrero (born 1982), Colombian bowler

D
Dan Guerrero (born 1951), American athletic director
Dolores Guerrero-Cruz (born 1948), American artist
Denisse Guerrero (born 1980), Mexican musician
Diane Guerrero (born 1986), American actress

E
Ed Guerrero, American academic and film historian
Eddie Guerrero (1967–2005), Mexican-American professional wrestler
Edgar Guerrero (born 1979), Mexican-American musician
Eduardo Guerrero (cyclist) (born 1971), Colombian road cyclist
Eduardo Guerrero (rower) (1928–2015), Argentine rower
Epy Guerrero (1942–2013), Dominican baseball scout
Ernesto Guerrero (born 1975), American composer and musician known as Ego Plum
Eunice Pablo Guerrero-Cucueco (1949–1991), Filipino politician
Evelyn Guerrero (born 1949), American actress

F
Fernando Guerrero (Ecuadorian footballer) (born 1989), Ecuadorian soccer player
Fernando Guerrero (boxer) (born 1986), Dominican boxer
Fernando María Guerrero (1873–1929), Filipino politician, lawyer and writer
Flora Guerrero, Mexican artist and environmentalist
Francisco Guerrero (composer) (1528–1599), Spanish composer of the Renaissance
Francisco Guerrero (politician) (1811–1851), Mexican politician
Francisco Guerrero Cárdennas (born 1934), Spanish soccer player
Francisco Guerrero Marín (1951–1997), Spanish composer
Francisco Antonio de Guerrero y Torres (1727–1792), Mexican architect
Francisco Gabriel Guerrero (born 1977), Argentine soccer player

G
Gabriel Guerrero (born 1993) , baseball player
Giancarlo Guerrero (born 1969), conductor
Gigi Saul Guerrero, a Mexican-Canadian filmmaker and actress
Gonzalo Guerrero, Spanish sailor and Mayan warrior
Gory Guerrero (1921–1990), Mexican-American professional wrestler and patriarch of the Guerrero wrestling family

H
Héctor Guerrero (born 1954), Mexican-American professional wrestler
Hugo Guerrero Marthineitz (1924–2010), Peruvian journalist

I
Ivan Guerrero, American filmmaker
Iván Guerrero (born 1977), Honduran soccer player

J

Jacinto Guerrero (1895–1951), Spanish composer
Javi Guerrero (born 1976), Spanish soccer player
Jesús Guerrero (born 1949), Spanish handball player
Jesús Guerrero Galván (1910–1973), Mexican artist
José Daniel Guerrero (born 1987), Mexican soccer player
José Félix Guerrero (born 1975), Spanish soccer player
José Gustavo Guerrero (1876–1958), Salvadoran judge and diplomat
José María Guerrero de Arcos y Molina (1799–1852), Nicaraguan president
Josep Guerrero, Danish engineer
Joshua Guerrero (born 1983), American operatic tenor
Juan Guerrero (born 1967), Dominican baseball player
Juan Pan Guerrero (born 1949), Northern Marianan politician and businessperson
Julen Guerrero (born 1974), Basque/Spanish football player

L
Lalo Guerrero (1916–2005), Mexican-American musician
Lena Guerrero (1957–2008), American politician
León María Guerrero (botanist) (1853–1935), Filipino scientist and revolutionary
León María Guerrero (diplomat) (1915–1982), Filipino writer and diplomat
Lisa Guerrero (born 1964), American television presenter and model
Lorenzo Guerrero (1900–1981), Nicaraguan politician
Lorenzo I. De Leon Guerrero (1935–2006), Northern Marianas politician
Lou Leon Guerrero (born 1950), Guamanian politician
Lucrecia Guerrero, Mexican-American writer
Luis Guerrero (born 1953), Peruvian politician

M
Mando Guerrero (born 1952), Mexican-American professional wrestler
Manuel Amador Guerrero (1833–1909), Panamanian president
Manuel Flores Leon Guerrero (1914–1985), Guamanian politician
Marcelo Guerrero (born 1983), Uruguayan soccer player
Marcos Guerrero (born 1984), Spanish soccer player
María Guerrero (1867–1928), Spanish stage actor and director
Mario Guerrero (born 1949), Dominican baseball player
Miguel Ángel Guerrero (born 1990), Spanish soccer player

N 

 Niana Guerrero (born 2006) Filipina dancer and social media personality
 Natalia Guerrero (born 1987) Mexican actress

O
Osvaldo Álvarez Guerrero (1940–2008), Argentine politician
Óscar Guerrero Silva (1971–2004), Mexican drug lord

P
Paolo Guerrero (born 1984), Peruvian soccer player
Pedro Guerrero (baseball, born 1956), Dominican baseball player
Pedro Guerrero (composer) (c. 1520- after 1560), Spanish composer
Pedro E. Guerrero (1917–2012), American photographer
Pedro Oliverio Guerrero (1970–2010), Colombian drug lord
Pere Guerrero (born 1973), Spanish canoer
Práxedis Guerrero (1882–1910), Mexican revolutionary

Q
Quetzal Guerrero, American musician

R
Ramon Deleon Guerrero (1946–2018), Northern Marianan politician
Robert Guerrero (born 1983), American boxer
Roberto Guerrero (born 1958), Colombian racing driver
Rodrigo Guerrero (born 1988), Mexican boxer
Rosa Ramirez Guerrero (born 1934), Mexican-American educator

S
Sandy Guerrero (born 1966), Dominican baseball player
Shaul Guerrero (born 1990), American professional wrestler
Stephanie Guerrero, American beauty queen

T
Tayron Guerrero (born 1991), Colombian baseball player
Tommy Guerrero (born 1966), American skateboarder and musician
Tony Guerrero (born 1966), American musician

V
Vicente Guerrero (1782–1831), Mexican president
Vickie Guerrero (born 1968), American professional wrestling personality
Vladimir Guerrero (born 1975), Dominican baseball player
Vladimir Guerrero Jr. (born 1999), Canadian-born Dominican baseball player

W
Wilfrido Ma. Guerrero (1910–1995), Filipino playwright
Wilton Guerrero (born 1974), Dominican baseball player

References

Lists of people by surname
Spanish-language surnames
Occupational surnames